Sierra College is a public community college in Rocklin, California.

History
The college was officially founded in 1936 and is fully accredited by the Western Association of Schools and Colleges. This is the date that the school uses as the official establishment, even though it had been operating under various names and places before this. It was established as "Placer Junior College". In 1954 the college was named "College of the Sierras" with a wolverine as the mascot. There were other junior colleges named after regions. These included: College of the Redwoods, College of the Sequoias & College of the Siskiyous  The main campus in Rocklin was chosen by 1960, out of 35 possible sites. The planned construction of Interstate 80 was a consideration in the decision making. In 1961, the new campus opened.

In 1996, another campus in Nevada County opened, in between Grass Valley and Nevada City. During 2000–2005, outreach campuses in Roseville and near Truckee were opened.

It is governed by a board of seven trustees who are elected district-wide and a student trustee. Only five individuals have held the post of president in the last 50 years.

Academics
Approximately 125 degree and certificate programs are offered in a wide variety of configurations taught by 216 full and 650 part-time faculty members. Faculty typically has the minimum of a master's degree in their fields and enhance their teaching with research, authorship and industry expertise. Classes are offered both in traditional "on-ground" classrooms and, increasingly, in an online format.

Athletics
The Sierra College mascot is the Wolverine. Sierra College participates in the Big 8 Conference, and is a member of the California Community College Athletic Association.

Athletic eventsThe 2002 USA Cross Country Championships were held on the Sierra College cross country course.

Student body association
A California nonprofit public benefit corporation named "Associated Students of Sierra College" (ASSC) has been operating at Sierra College since 1959. The board of trustees of the Sierra Joint Community College District has authorized ASSC to operate at Sierra College as a "student body association". In addition, ASSC "is recognized as the official voice for the students in District consultation processes".

Notable people
 Buffy Wicks, California State Assembly member, District 15
 Ryan Guzman, actor and model
 Alex Obert, current captain of the United States water polo team, competed in the 2020 Summer Olympics.
 Hans Ostrom, writer and professor
 John Romero, game designer
 Heather Rene Smith, Playboy Playmate of the Month (February 2007)
 James LeVoy Sorenson, inventor and entrepreneur
 Fenuki Tupou, offensive guard for the Philadelphia Eagles
Brandon Aiyuk, NFL wide receiver for the San Francisco 49ers
 Joseph James DeAngelo, Golden State Killer
 Alexis Alford, youngest person to travel to every country

References

External links
 Official website

Universities and colleges in Placer County, California
Educational institutions established in 1936
1936 establishments in California
Schools accredited by the Western Association of Schools and Colleges
California Community Colleges